Saint-Léon-le-Grand is a parish municipality in Quebec, Canada.

Geography 
Saint-Léon-le-Grand is located on the southern slope of the St. Lawrence River, 430 km northeast of Quebec City and 110 km southeast of Rimouski. Important towns near Saint-Léon-le-Grand are Amqui at 12 km and Lac-au-Saumon at 16 km to the east. Causapscal at 27 km to the east as well as Sayabec at 33 km to the north. Saint-Léon-le-Grand is located on Route 195 halfway between Amqui and Saint-Zénon-du-Lac-Humqui. The territory of Saint-Léon-le-Grand covers an area of 127 km2. Most of this territory is mountainous and covered with forests.

The municipality of Saint-Léon-le-Grand is located in the regional county municipality (RCM) of La Matapédia in the administrative region of Bas-Saint-Laurent. The eponymous parish of Saint-Léon-le-Grand is located in the Roman Catholic Archdiocese of Rimouski and, more specifically, in the pastoral region of La Matapédia. Saint-Léon-le-Grand is part of the Gaspésie tourist region in the Matapédia Valley tourist sub-region.

Demographics 

See also
 List of parish municipalities in Quebec

References

Parish municipalities in Quebec
Incorporated places in Bas-Saint-Laurent
La Matapédia Regional County Municipality
Canada geography articles needing translation from French Wikipedia